Jona railway station is a railway station in Switzerland, situated next to the village of Jona (canton of St. Gallen). It is one of four active railway stations in the municipality of Rapperswil-Jona (the other three being ,  and ). The station is located on the Wallisellen to Uster and Rapperswil railway line.

Jona railway station and adjacent bus station were remodelled between 2013 and 2015. In 2021, it was awarded the Swiss mobility price (FLUX).

Service

Train 
The station is only called at by S-Bahn-style services of the Zurich S-Bahn network. During weekends, there is also a nighttime S-Bahn service (SN5) offered by ZVV. Summary of S-Bahn services:

 Zürich S-Bahn:
 : half-hourly service to  via , and to  via .
 Nighttime S-Bahn (only during weekends):

Bus 
There are several bus routes to/from Jona railway station. While lines 991, 992 and 994 all depart from the forecourt of the station, lines 621, 622 and 995 depart from Kreuz, and line 993 from Vogelau (both of these bus stops are within walking distance). The bus lines are as follows:

Gallery

References

External links 

Jona station on Swiss Federal Railway's web site

Jona
Buildings and structures in Rapperswil-Jona
Jona
Railway stations in Switzerland opened in 1979